Roland Leroy (4 May 1926 – 25 February 2019) was a French journalist and politician. He served as a Communist member of the National Assembly from 1956 to 1958, and from 1967 to 1981, representing Seine-Maritime.

References

1926 births
2019 deaths
People from Saint-Aubin-lès-Elbeuf
20th-century French journalists
Politicians from Normandy
French Communist Party politicians
Communist members of the French Resistance
Deputies of the 3rd National Assembly of the French Fourth Republic
Deputies of the 3rd National Assembly of the French Fifth Republic
Deputies of the 4th National Assembly of the French Fifth Republic
Deputies of the 5th National Assembly of the French Fifth Republic
Deputies of the 6th National Assembly of the French Fifth Republic
Officiers of the Légion d'honneur
Burials at Père Lachaise Cemetery